Ulrike Stanggassinger (22 February 1968 in Berchtesgaden – 1 July 2019 in Berchtesgaden) was a German former alpine skier who competed in the 1988 Winter Olympics.

External links
 sports-reference.com

References 

1968 births
2019 deaths
People from Berchtesgaden
Sportspeople from Upper Bavaria
Olympic alpine skiers of West Germany
Alpine skiers at the 1988 Winter Olympics
German female alpine skiers
20th-century German women